Lac Brochet is a lake in north-west Manitoba, Canada. The westernmost extensions of the lake reach almost to the border with Saskatchewan. Lac Brochet, Manitoba the main community and administrative centre of the Northlands First Nation is located on its eastern shore. The Cochrane River flows from Wollaston Lake through Lac Brochet on its way to Reindeer Lake.

See also 
List of lakes of Manitoba
 Brochet, Manitoba (a community on Reindeer Lake)

References 

Brochet